"MacArthur Park" is a song written by American singer-songwriter Jimmy Webb that was recorded first by Irish actor and singer Richard Harris in 1968. Harris's version peaked at number two on the Billboard Hot 100 chart and number four on the UK Singles Chart. "MacArthur Park" was subsequently covered by numerous artists, including a 1969 Grammy-winning version by country music singer Waylon Jennings and a number one Billboard Hot 100 disco arrangement by Donna Summer in 1978.

In 1967, producer Bones Howe had asked Webb to create a pop song with different movements and changing time signatures. Webb delivered "MacArthur Park" to Howe with "everything he wanted", but Howe did not care for the ambitious arrangement and unorthodox lyrics and the song was rejected by the group The Association, for whom it had been intended.

Jimmy Webb songwriting

Composition
"MacArthur Park" was written and composed by Jimmy Webb in the summer and fall of 1967 as part of an intended cantata. Webb brought the entire cantata to The Association, but the group rejected it. The inspiration for the song was his relationship and breakup with Susie Horton. MacArthur Park, in Los Angeles, was where the couple would occasionally meet for lunch and spent their most enjoyable times together. At that time (the middle of 1965), Horton worked for Aetna insurance, whose offices were across the street from the park. When asked by interviewer Terry Gross what was going through his mind when he wrote the song's lyrics, Webb replied that it was meant to be symbolic and referred to the end of a love affair. In an interview with Newsday in October 2014, Webb explained:

Webb and Horton remained friends, even after her marriage to another man. The breakup was also the primary influence for "By the Time I Get to Phoenix", another song written and composed by Webb.

The idea to write and compose a classically structured song with several movements that could be played on the radio came from a challenge by music producer Bones Howe, who produced recordings for The Association.

Richard Harris original version

Background and release
"MacArthur Park" was first recorded by Richard Harris, after he met the composer at a fundraiser in East Los Angeles, California in late 1967. Webb had been invited to provide the musical backdrop at the piano. Out of the blue, Harris, who had just starred in the film Camelot and had performed several musical numbers in it, suggested to Webb that he wanted to release a record. At first, Webb did not take Harris seriously, but later he received a telegram from Harris requesting that Webb "come to London and make a record". Webb flew to London and played Harris a number of songs for the project, but none seemed to fit Harris for his pop music debut. The last song that Webb played for Harris was "MacArthur Park".

The track was recorded on December 21, 1967, at Armin Steiner's Sound Recorders in Hollywood. String, woodwind, and brass overdubs were recorded over two sessions on December 29 and 30.
The musicians in the original studio recording included members of the Wrecking Crew of Los Angeles-based studio musicians who played on many of the hit records of the 1960s and 1970s. Personnel used included Hal Blaine on drums, Larry Knechtel on keyboards, Joe Osborn on bass guitar, and Tommy Tedesco and Mike Deasy on guitars, along with Webb himself on harpsichord.

The song was included on Harris's album A Tramp Shining in 1968 and selected for release as a single, an unusual choice, given the song's length and complex structure. It was released in April 1968 and was played by 77 WABC on Tuesday April 9, 1968. It made its way onto the Hot 100 at number 79 on May 11, 1968, peaking at number 2 on June 22, 1968, behind Herb Alpert's "This Guy's in Love with You". It peaked at number 10 on Billboard's Easy Listening survey and was number 8 on WABC's overall 1968 chart. It topped the music charts in Europe and Australia and also won the 1969 Grammy Award for Best Arrangement Accompanying Vocalist(s).

Chart history

Weekly charts

Year-end charts

Donna Summer version

Background and release
In September 1978, American singer Donna Summer released a multi-million selling vinyl single disco version of "MacArthur Park". The song reached number one on the Billboard Hot 100 the week of November 11, 1978, for  3 weeks, and earned Summer her first nomination for the Grammy Award for Best Female Pop Vocal Performance. Summer was also nominated for Favorite Pop/Rock Female at the American Music Awards where her album Live and More took the award for Favorite Disco Album. She became the first female artist of the modern era to have the number one single and album simultaneously on the Billboard pop charts (the week of November 11, 1978).

Italian producer Giorgio Moroder would recall that he and his collaborator Pete Bellotte had been interested in the concept of either remixing a track – as yet undecided on – which had been a hit in the 1960s or else remaking a 1960s hit as a dance track: Moroder – "I remember that I was driving in... on the Hollywood Freeway, and I heard the original song [i.e. "MacArthur Park" by Richard Harris] on the radio. I thought: 'That's it – that's the song we've been looking for almost a year. Moroder asked Neil Bogart, president of Casablanca Records, to provide him with a copy of the Richard Harris version of "MacArthur Park" to serve as the basis for Moroder's envisioned discofied reinvention: Bogart obliged with an 8-track tape containing Harris's version, prompting Moroder to buy an 8-track player in order to hear it.

Moroder readily identified "MacArthur Park" as (quote) "a great song for Donna – with all those high notes, it was perfect [for her]... First, I [located] a key that she could sing really high, but still with a big voice – that took an hour or two. I played a little piano and she sang it with my accompaniment. We found a key and we had Greg Mathieson do the arrangement – and then I did something very special" – that "something very special" being Moroder's recording of his own voice to form a choir heard behind Summer on the song's chorus: "I recorded about 20 seconds of all the notes, which I was able to sing on a 24-track. I made a loop of those notes, and put that loop in the [Solid State Logic] desk. I could form eight chords by having C-E-G right on the group. I played the chords by moving the track according to the chord that I needed." Of basing a discofied arrangement on the template for Webb's arrangement on the Harris version Moroder would recall: "To be honest, it was a very difficult song to [arrange], especially the brass, but we had the best musicians in town."

Summer's recording of "MacArthur Park", included as part of the "MacArthur Park Suite" on her double album Live and More, was eight minutes and forty seconds long. The shorter seven-inch vinyl single version – which omits the song's balladic second movement – afforded Summer her first #1 hit on the Billboard Hot 100, also becoming the last of seven hit versions of compositions by Jimmy Webb to reach the Top Ten on the Hot 100, with "MacArthur Park" by Donna Summer being the only recording of a Webb composition to top the Hot 100.

Record World reported that this version produces a "dazzling" effect and that "the syn-drums and inspired production techniques are occasional and dramatic."

The nearly 18-minute musical medley "MacArthur Park Suite" incorporated the original songs "One of a Kind" and "Heaven Knows", the latter being issued as the second single off Live and More. This medley was also sold as a 12-inch (30 cm) vinyl recording, and it stayed at number one on Billboards Hot Dance Club Songs chart for five weeks in 1978.

The versions of this medley in Live and More and in the 12-inch recording are notably different in the presentation of the two original songs. In the 12-inch version, "Heaven Knows" was extended to incorporate the instrumental string introduction and the bridge horn solo of the single version for radio stations, but left out the second verse, and "One of a Kind" was trimmed of a large part of the instrumental break but included the second verse. Lyrically, Summer's rendition is also curious, in that it adds the word "Chinese" to clarify what type of checkers were being played.

"MacArthur Park Suite" was not included on the compact disc version of Live and More because of early CD limitations; however, the album version is available on 1987's The Dance Collection: A Compilation of Twelve Inch Singles. The 12" Special One-Sided Disco DJ Single has been digitally remastered and included on the Bad Girls digipak double CD release.  In 2012, "Live and More" was remastered in Japan and included the original LP version of the "MacArthur Park Suite".

In 2013, the song was remixed by Laidback Luke for the Donna Summer remix album Love To Love You Donna (it was also remixed by Ralphi Rosario and Frank Lamboy), which was released to dance clubs all over America, having a successful peaking at No. 1, giving Summer her first posthumous No. 1 and her twentieth No. 1 overall.

British electronic duo Pet Shop Boys used a sample of Summer's version in their 1999 song New York City Boy.

Charts

Weekly charts

Year-end charts

All-time charts

Other versions 
A cover version of "MacArthur Park" was recorded by country music singer Waylon Jennings on his 1969 album Country-Folk, which included the family group the Kimberlys. This version charted at number 23 on Hot Country Songs and number 93 on the Billboard Hot 100, making its chart debut on August 23, 1969. It also won both acts the 1969 Grammy Award for Best Country Performance by a Duo or Group with Vocal. It was revisited in 1976 by Jennings, on his album Are You Ready for the Country.

In late 1969, Tony Bennett's cover reached No. 39 on the US Easy Listening chart and No. 40 Canadian Adult Contemporary.

The Four Tops version (1971) reached number 38 on the Billboard Hot 100 chart and number 37 in Canada. The Andy Williams version (1972) debuted on the Easy Listening chart in early August and rose to number 26 over the course of five weeks.

A cover version of "MacArthur Park" was recorded by Scottish progressive rock band Beggars Opera on their 1972 album Pathfinder. Their eight-minute version was panned by music critic Paul Stump who said that the band "over-eggs the already indigestible pudding" of the song.

According to one database there are at least 191 versions of the song.

See also 
 List of number-one dance singles of 2013 (U.S.)
 Jurassic Park (song)

References

External links 
 Cite from Fred Bronson, The Billboard Book of Number One Hits, Billboard, 1988
 Link to The Lou Gordon Home Page

1968 singles
1972 singles
1978 singles
Songs written by Jimmy Webb
Richard Harris songs
Andy Williams songs
Donna Summer songs
Waylon Jennings songs
Tony Bennett songs
Glen Campbell songs
Billboard Hot 100 number-one singles
Cashbox number-one singles
Song recordings produced by Giorgio Moroder
Song recordings produced by Pete Bellotte
RCA Records singles
Disco songs
Pop ballads
Rock ballads
Songs about Los Angeles
Torch songs
Four Tops songs
Song recordings produced by Frank Wilson (musician)
1968 songs
1960s ballads
Dunhill Records singles
Grammy Award for Best Instrumental Arrangement Accompanying Vocalist(s)
Casablanca Records singles
Number-one singles in Australia
RPM Top Singles number-one singles